Tim Buckley (1947–1975) was an American musician.

Tim Buckley may also refer to:
Tim Buckley (album), 1966
Tim Buckley (basketball) (born 1963), American college basketball coach
Mortimer J. Buckley (born 1969), American business executive
Tim Buckley, author of Ctrl+Alt+Del (webcomic)
Timothy Buckley, subject of The Tailor and Ansty
Thomas Buckley (born 1942, died 2015), American anthropologist and Buddhist monastic also known as "Tim Buckley"

Buckley, Tim